Aspernstraße is a station on  of the Vienna U-Bahn. It is located in Aspern in the Donaustadt District. The station was opened on 2 October 2010 with the opening of the third section of the U2 between Stadion and Aspernstraße.

The station has two tracks on an island platform with departures towards Karlsplatz and Seestadt. To the north of the station is a siding, allowing trains to terminate and then change directions.

Between 2 October 2010 and 5 October 2013, Aspernstraße was the eastern terminus of the U2. Upon the opening of Seestadt, which is now the eastern terminus of the line, approximately every second train terminates at Aspernstaße.

Due to its location in the center of the Donaustadt district, directly on Donau Straße (B3), Aspernstraße station is a key transportation point in the east of the city. In addition to the U2, five bus lines terminate at the station. The station is a key connection between lines from the surrounding areas of Hirschstetten and Essling as well as the eastern Viennese surroundings, to the metro system.

References

External links 
 

Buildings and structures in Donaustadt
Railway stations opened in 2010
Vienna U-Bahn stations